Goodenia cycloptera is a species of flowering plant in the family Goodeniaceae and is endemic to Australia. It is a widely distributed, perennial or annual herb with wavy or toothed leaves, yellow flowers arranged in leafy racemes and more or less spherical fruit.

Description
Flowering occurs in most months and the fruit is more or less spherical capsule  in diameter.

Taxonomy and naming
Goodenia cycloptera was first formally described in 1849 Robert Brown  in the Botanical Index to Charles Sturt's Narrative of an Expedition into Central Australia. The specific epithet (cycloptera) means "circle-winged", referring to the seeds.

Distribution and habitat
Goodenia cycloptera grows in a sandy soils in the drier inland parts of Western Australia, South Australia, the Northern Territory, Queensland and New South Wales.

References

cycloptera
Flora of South Australia
Eudicots of Western Australia
Flora of the Northern Territory
Flora of Queensland
Flora of New South Wales
Plants described in 1849
Taxa named by Robert Brown (botanist, born 1773)